In organic chemistry, a methiodide is a chemical derivative produced by the reaction of a compound with methyl iodide.  Methiodides are often formed through the methylation of tertiary amines:
 R3N + CH3I → (CH3)R3N+I−
Whereas the parent amines are hydrophobic and often oily, methiodides, being salts, are somewhat hydrophilic and exhibit high melting points.  Methiodides exhibit altered pharmacological properties as well.  

Examples include:
 Cocaine methiodide, a charged cocaine analog which cannot pass the blood brain barrier and enter the brain
 Bicuculline methiodide, a water-soluble form of bicuculline

Tertiary phosphines and phosphite esters also form methiodides.

References

Quaternary ammonium compounds